Mount Ronui (also Roniu, Roonui and Rooniu) is a shield volcano of 1332m (or 1321m) in Tahiti Iti, which is the south-eastern part of Tahiti in French Polynesia in the south Pacific. It is one of the principal peaks on the island and the highest in Tahiti Iti.

It is one of three volcanoes to which the formation of Tahiti is attributed.

References 

Mountains of Tahiti
Mountains of French Polynesia
Volcanoes of French Polynesia